This page has a list of closed pairs of English rhyming words—in each pair, both words rhyme with each other and only with each other.

Monosyllabic pairs
bairn, cairn
boosts, roosts
coaxed, hoaxed
dwarfed, morphed
how've, Lauv
lounge, scrounge
lymph, nymph
palped, scalped
salve, valve
smooth, soothe

Disyllabic pairs

Trochaic pairs
In a trochaic pair, each word is a trochee, with the first syllable stressed and the second syllable unstressed.

agile, fragile
anguish, languish
ankle, rankle
anther, panther
argent, sergeant
ascot, mascot
audit, plaudit
austral, claustral
awful, lawful
badger, cadger
bailiff, caliph
bantam, phantom
bargain, jargon
Bernard, gurnard
beverage, leverage
biggin, piggin
biplane, triplane
birchen, urchin
bittern, cittern
bodice, goddess
bonnet, sonnet
briefly, chiefly
booger, sugar
broadcast, podcast
bullet, pullet
buskin, Ruskin
buttock, futtock
cadre, padre
cartridge, partridge
cavern, tavern
central, ventral
cheaply, deeply
cherish, perish
Christmas, isthmus
churlish, girlish
clothing, loathing
coastal, postal
cockney, knock-knee
coffee, toffee
collet, wallet
colored, dullard
coltish, doltish
combat, wombat
cornet, hornet
corpus, porpoise
corset, Dorset
cortex, vortex
Cossacks, Trossachs

coven, oven
cowboy, ploughboy
crackpot, jackpot
curlew, purlieu
custom, frustum
darken, hearken
darkling, sparkling
deafest, prefaced
detail, retail
dictum, victim
discal, fiscal
dockside, oxide
doesn't, wasn't
doorway, Norway
dovetail, love-tale
druid, fluid
emu, seamew
errand, gerund
exile, flexile
extant, sextant
eyebrow, highbrow
faithful, scatheful
farness, harness
fescue, rescue
figment, pigment
finis, Guinness
Finland, inland
fitness, witness
fixture, mixture
flagship, hagship
flourish, nourish
fountain, mountain
frequence, sequence
fustic, rustic
gallant, talent
ghostess, hostess
ghostly, mostly
gibbon, ribbon
grapnel, shrapnel
gremlin, Kremlin
gusset, russet
harpist, sharpest
hazard, mazzard
Hendon, tendon
highland, island
hireling, squireling
hotness, squatness

image, scrimmage
inkhorn, stinkhorn
juncture, puncture
junket, plunket
keyboard, seaboard
kiddish, Yiddish
kidney, Sidney
lappet, tappet
launder, maunder
layoff, playoff
leeward, seaward
lengthen, strengthen
lilacs, smilax
livid, vivid
lonely, only
lordship, wardship
loudly, proudly
loyal, royal
luncheon, truncheon
magnate, stagnate
menu, venue
milder, wilder
mileage, silage
minnow, winnow
modus, nodus
mopish, Popish
mournful, scornful
mufti, tufty
nescience, prescience
nonage, Swanage
nostrum, rostrum
nuisance, usance
ogress, progress
pallor, valor
parsley, sparsely
peevish, thievish
person, worsen
pinto, Shinto
rabid, tabid
rhymeless, timeless
ripened, stipend
ripplet, triplet
ruttish, sluttish
Scotsman, yachtsman
Scottish, sottish
sextile, textile
siphon, hyphen
spoonful, tuneful
tasteful, wasteful
torpor, warper
tumbril, umbril

Trochaic-or-iambic pairs
In an trochaic-or-iambic pair, each word can be either a trochee (stressed on the first syllable) or an iamb (stressed on the second syllable). 
contract, entr'acte
discount, miscount
hereby, nearby
sunlit, unlit
thereby, whereby
therein, wherein
thereof, whereof
therewith, wherewith

Iambic pairs
In an iambic pair, each word is an iamb and has the first syllable unstressed and the second syllable stressed.
barrage, garage
chorale, morale
eclipsed, ellipsed
gyrate, irate
henceforth, thenceforth
Koran, Oran
purvey, survey

Trisyllabic pairs

Dactylic pairs
In a dactylic pair, each word is a dactyl and has the first syllable stressed and the second and third syllables unstressed.
agitate, sagittate
analyst, panellist
article, particle
bandmaster, grandmaster
banister, canister
bingeworthy, cringeworthy
bonytail, ponytail
brotherhood, motherhood
charlatan, tarlatan
collier, jollier
copulate, populate
creepier, sleepier
cuneiform, uniform
devious, previous
Everest, cleverest
fealty, realty
fortify, mortify
gradient, radiant
javelin, ravelin
jawbreaker, lawbreaker
jitterbug, litterbug
Kodiak, zodiac
lexicon, Mexican
loyalty, royalty
manhandle, panhandle
medium, tedium
mellophone, telephone
minister, sinister
modulate, nodulate
mutiny, scrutiny
president, resident
serpentine, turpentine (in RP, and some British English dialects)

Amphibrachic pairs
In an amphibrachic pair, each word is an amphibrach and has the second syllable stressed and the first and third syllables unstressed.
attainder, remainder
autumnal, columnal
concoction, decoction (In GA, these rhyme with auction; there is also the YouTube slang word obnoxion, meaning something that is obnoxious.)
distinguish, extinguish
pneumatic, rheumatic

Anapestic pairs
In an anapestic pair, each word is an anapest and has the first and second syllables unstressed and the third syllable stressed.

At this time, no anapestic pairs have been found.  The pair "uneclipsed, unellipsed" is disqualified because uneclipsed also rhymes with ellipsed, and because unellipsed also rhymes with eclipsed.

Tetrasyllabic pairs
beautifully, dutifully
copulated, populated
culminated, fulminated
deifying, reifying
delegated, relegated
generated, venerated
lacerated, macerated
lecherously, treacherously

Pentasyllabic pairs
constabulary, vocabulary

Asymmetric pairs
In an asymmetric pair, the words differ in number of syllables.  Each pair is in a subsection according to the respective numbers of syllables in the words when they are in alphabetical order.

Disyllabic-and-monosyllabic pairs

Disyllabic-and-trisyllabic pairs
cerement, endearment
crucial, fiducial
digest (noun), obligest

Disyllabic-and-balls pairs
thinnest, violinist (although Bentley's Miscellany does contain the line "The Dublin Stout out-Guinnessed Guinness")

Trisyllabic-and-disyllabic pairs
combustion, fustian
diminished, finished
eleventh, seventh

Trisyllabic-and-tetrasyllabic pairs
bestial, celestial
bigotry, obligatory
brilliant, resilient
cordial, primordial
fricative, indicative

Tetrasyllabic-and-trisyllabic

alluvial, pluvial
behaviour, saviour
commodity, oddity (In GA, these rhyme with Alaudidae)
emergency, urgency
habitual, ritual
sarrusophone, sousaphone

Pentasyllabic-and-tetrasyllabic pairs
annihilated, violated
illuminated, ruminated

See also
List of English words without rhymes

External links
RhymeZone rhyming dictionary and thesaurus
Merriam-Webster's Word Central
RhymeBrain Rhyming Dictionary. Easy to read on your phone.
Rhymes.net
Category:English rhymes - Wiktionary

Rhyme
Rhyme